The Clicquot Club Company (pronounced "Kleek-O"), also known as Clicquot Club Beverages, was one of the largest national beverage companies. It sold Ginger ale and several varieties of soda. After 80 years of operation, the company was bought by Cott Beverage Corporation in 1965 and eventually dissolved.

History

Founded in 1881 in what is now known as Millis, Massachusetts, Henry Millis (son of Lansing Millis, after whom the town was named in 1885) made a suggestion to Charles LaCroix, of the LaCroix Fruit Farm, that he call his sparkling cider "Clicquot" - after the famous French champagne, Veuve Clicquot - and start selling it. Shortly after, Clicquot Club was built by Henry Millis from money he had received from his father, Lansing.

The company produced mainly sparkling cider for the first few years but later on Millis would experiment in other flavors as well. The sparkling cider was soon dropped and the company began focusing mainly on ginger ale. During this time the soda company hired a significant amount of the town's residents and would continue to do so for years to come. Millis continued to improve upon his beverages through his philosophy of making the drinks as though he were making them for his own friends. He imported high-quality exotic ingredients including Jamaican ginger, and Cuban pure refined sugar. These two were the key ingredients to his ginger ale making the company standout in this field.

Even though word of his soda spread over southeastern New England in the next few years, the cost of such fine ingredients eventually forced Henry Millis to sell his company in 1901. The new proprietors, Horace A. Kimball and his son, H. Earle Kimball, took advantage of every form of advertising, including the character "Kleek-O the Eskimo Boy" (which became a well-known advertising symbol); an animated sign in Manhattan's Times Square (the largest animated sign in the world from 1924 to 1926); and even a musical variety radio program, The Clicquot Club Eskimos, led by banjo player Harry F. Reser. There were 25 sessions of records under the supervision of Harry Reser and issued under the name "Clicquot Club Eskimos" recorded from December, 1925 through February, 1931.

Such clever marketing expanded the company until the factory in Millis became 1/3 of a mile long and even had its own private train station. The area around this massive factory became known as "Millis-Clicquot, Massachusetts." The company also was responsible for a number of pioneering moves in an effort to meet demand: In 1893, Clicquot Club was the first to put a metal cap on a bottle; in 1934, the first to sell quart bottles; and in 1938 the company became the first to sell its beverages in a can, at this time known as a "cone-top" can, making it easier to manufacture.

With the establishment of a new network of Clicquot Club Bottling Plants in 1938 the company soon had dozens of factories across the country. This number grew rapidly until in 1952 the company had plants in over 100 cities all across the United States, from Maine to California. In the 1950s the company began distributing internationally, in places such as Jamaica, Nassau, the Bahamas, virtually all of South America, and the Philippines. The company began to decline in sales worldwide amid growing competition from other soft drink makers and was purchased in 1969 by the Cott Beverage Corporation of Connecticut. The Cott Corporation eventually sold off all product surplus before shutting down Clicquot. Today the original plant in Millis remains mostly abandoned, although one-third of it is (as of January 2013) occupied by garden and hardware stores. Although there has been contemplation of starting the company back up again in recent years, no attempts have ever gotten further than the drawing board.

References

Resources
Clicquot Club Page
Clicquot Club Cafe (archived)
Clicquot Fox Trot March printed piano music, Copyright 1926 by Harry F. Reser, 148th W. 46th St., New York, N.Y., U.S.A.

American soft drinks
Drink companies of the United States
Food and drink companies established in 1881
Companies based in Massachusetts
Food and drink companies disestablished in 1980
Ginger ale
1881 establishments in Massachusetts
Food and drink companies based in Massachusetts
1980 disestablishments in Massachusetts
1965 mergers and acquisitions